Camponotus universitatis is a species of ant in the genus Camponotus, the carpenter ants. It is native to Eurasia, where it has been recorded in Spain, France, Italy, Switzerland, Albania, Bulgaria, and Turkey.

This species is a parasite of other carpenter ants, such as Camponotus aethiops and Camponotus pilicornis.

References

universitatis
Hymenoptera of Europe
Insects described in 1890
Taxonomy articles created by Polbot